Anthony Cheung (born January 17, 1982) is an American composer and a pianist.

Early life and education 
Cheung was born in San Francisco in 1982. He earned a Bachelor of Arts degree in music and history from Harvard University and a PhD in music from Columbia University.

Career 
Cheung composes a wide range of concert music, including solo and orchestral works. His works have been commissioned by Ensemble Modern, Ensemble Intercontemporain, and the Cleveland Orchestra, among others. He won a Guggenheim Fellowship in 2016, the Rome Prize in 2013, and first prize in the Sixth International Dutilleux Competition (2008).

Cheung was the co-director of the Grossman Ensemble at the University of Chicago. He is an associate professor of music at Brown University.

References

External links 
 

Living people
American classical pianists
American male classical pianists
American male composers
University of Chicago faculty
Brown University faculty
Columbia University School of the Arts alumni
Harvard College alumni
1982 births